Haïm Capoussi Synagogue is a synagogue in Cairo, Egypt.

References 

Synagogues in Cairo